Iclănzel is a commune in Mureș County, Transylvania, Romania. It is composed of eleven villages: Căpușu de Câmpie (Mezőkapus), Chisălița (Tyiszelica), După Deal (Völgyön-túl), Fânațe (Szénafű), Fânațele Căpușului (Úriszénafű), Ghidașteu (Gidástó), Iclandu Mare (Nagyikland), Iclănzel, Mădărășeni (Hirtopa), Tăblășeni (Lekenceiforduló) and Valea Iclandului (Iklándivölgy).

See also
List of Hungarian exonyms (Mureș County)

References

Communes in Mureș County
Localities in Transylvania